Fabio Dal Zotto (born 17 July 1957) is an Italian fencer and Olympic champion in foil competition.

He won a gold medal in the individual foil event at the 1976 Summer Olympics in Montreal and a silver in the team event.

References

External links
 
 
 

1957 births
Living people
Italian male fencers
Italian foil fencers
Olympic fencers of Italy
Fencers at the 1976 Summer Olympics
Olympic gold medalists for Italy
Olympic silver medalists for Italy
Olympic medalists in fencing
Medalists at the 1976 Summer Olympics
Sportspeople from Vicenza